Menegazzia kantvillasii is a species of foliose lichen found in Australia and South America. It was described as new to science in 1992. The specific epithet honours Australian lichenologist Gintaras Kantvilas.

See also
List of Menegazzia species

References

kantvillasii
Lichen species
Lichens described in 1992
Lichens of Australia
Lichens of South America
Taxa named by Peter Wilfred James